Brigadier General Albert Camille Vital (born 18 July 1952) is a Malagasy Army officer, politician and civil engineer who was Prime Minister of Madagascar from 2009 to 2011. He is the president of the Parti Hiaraka Isika.

Life and career
Trained in the Soviet Union, Vital was Chief of the Technical Office of the State Forces Staff Development (1987–1991), and then appointed corps commander of the first regiment of the Military Region No. 5 Toliara (1998–2001) before training at the Ecole Supérieure de Guerre in Paris in 2001–2002.

On 20 December 2009, Vital was appointed as Prime Minister by President Andry Rajoelina, succeeding Eugène Mangalaza. After nearly two years in office, Vital was succeeded by Omer Beriziky on 28 October 2011.

After serving as Prime Minister, Vital was appointed as Permanent Representative to the United Nations Office at Geneva; he presented his credentials as Permanent Representative in August 2012. He stood as the candidate of the Parti Hiaraka Isika in the October 2013 presidential election, placing fifth with 6.85% of the vote. He supported Jean-Louis Robinson, the candidate associated with Marc Ravalomanana, in the second round of voting, held in December 2013.

References

1952 births
Living people
People from Toliara
Prime Ministers of Madagascar
Malagasy military personnel